Laura Bromet (born 17 January 1970) is a Dutch politician of GroenLinks and a member of the House of Representatives since 2018. 

Bromet studied Dutch language and literature and also cultural studies at the University of Amsterdam. She worked among others as a journalist, magazine editor, teacher, environmentalist, documentary filmmaker and adviser.

She was a councillor and subsequently an alderwoman of Waterland before becoming an MP in 2018.

Laura Bromet is the daughter of program maker Frans Bromet. She is partly of Jewish descent (her grandfather was Jewish). From 1996 until 2009, she was an executive at Bromet & dochters.

References

External links 
 Laura Bromet, House of Representatives of The Netherlands

1970 births
Living people
20th-century Dutch businesspeople
20th-century Dutch educators
20th-century Dutch journalists
20th-century Dutch non-fiction writers
20th-century Dutch women writers
20th-century women educators
21st-century Dutch businesspeople
21st-century Dutch non-fiction writers
21st-century Dutch politicians
21st-century Dutch women politicians
21st-century Dutch women writers
Aldermen in North Holland
Dutch business executives
Dutch documentary filmmakers
Dutch magazine editors
Dutch people of Jewish descent
Dutch schoolteachers
Dutch women environmentalists
Dutch women journalists
GroenLinks politicians
Members of the House of Representatives (Netherlands)
Municipal councillors in North Holland
People from Purmerend
People from Waterland
University of Amsterdam alumni
Women documentary filmmakers